Midvale is a former census-designated place (CDP) in Lincoln County, Montana, United States. The population was 393 at the 2010 census. The area was on the north side of the town of Eureka, but was annexed by the town after 2010.

References

Census-designated places in Lincoln County, Montana
Census-designated places in Montana